Harry Kinross White (born 1967) is an American-born classical saxophonist living in Switzerland.

Biography 

White grew up in Mississippi and received his first music instruction there from Warren and Marti Lutz. He studied with saxophone professor Lawrence Gwozdz at The University of Southern Mississippi in Hattiesburg, Mississippi and with the pioneer of classical saxophone, Sigurd Raschèr. He graduated from The University of Southern Mississippi in 1989 with a Bachelor's Degree in Saxophone Performance.

Rascher Saxophone Quartet
He was a member of the Raschèr Saxophone Quartet from 1990 until 2001. As a member of this ensemble he performed in many of the important halls of Europe and the United States, including Carnegie Hall and Lincoln Center in New York City, the Kennedy Center in Washington, D.C., Philharmonic Hall in Berlin, the Royal Festival Hall in London, and Opéra Bastille in Paris.

Solo career
Since leaving the Raschèr Saxophone Quartet in 2001, he has been active as a saxophone soloist and free-lance musician. Critics praised White for the unique, gentle tone quality he produces on his historical saxophone and for his dynamic interpretations of old and new works. He is fascinated with the lyrical possibilities of the saxophone and recently recorded songs of Edvard Grieg, as arranged for saxophone and piano, with the composer, pianist and lied expert Edward Rushton.

He concertizes regularly with the organist Jakoba Marten-Büsing and with the pianists Hans Adolfsen, Edward Rushton and Todd Sisley. He also performs with the Swiss singer La Lupa.

As a soloist he has appeared with many orchestras, including Radio Symphony Orchestra Stuttgart, Bochumer Symphoniker, Beethoven Orchester Bonn, and the Philharmonic Orchestras in Freiburg and Heidelberg. He performs regularly in the Orchestra of the Mannheim National Theatre. He performed with Sir Simon Rattle and the Berlin Philharmonic at the New Year's Eve concert 2002.

He is member of the "Harry White Trio" (since 2006) and the "Raschèr Saxophone Orchestra" which is based in southern Germany. He is also director of the "Swiss Saxophone Orchestra".

Recordings
The Raschèr Saxophone Quartet (1994); Caprice 21435
Anders Nilsson: KRASCH! (1995, with Raschèr Saxophone Quartet and Kroumata Percussion Ensemble); Caprice 21441
Sofia Gubaidulina (1995, with Raschèr Saxophone Quartet and Kroumata Percussion Ensemble); BIS-CD-710
Philip Glass Symphony No.2 (1998, with Rascher Saxophone Quartet and Stuttgart Chamber Orchestra); Nonesuch 79496-2
America (1999, with Raschèr Saxophone Quartet); BIS-953
Music for Saxophones (1999, with Raschèr Saxophone Quartet); Cala CD 77003
Violeta Dinescu – Reversing Fields (1999); Sargasso SCD 28027
Europe (2001,  with Raschèr Saxophone Quartet); BIS-1153
spectrum saxofonis (2001, with Todd Sisley, piano/harpsichord); Musicaphon M56836
 Miklós Maros – Oolit (2002, with Raschèr Saxophone Quartet); Caprice Records – CAP 21670 
Philip Glass - Saxophone (2002, with Raschèr Saxophone Quartet); Orange Mountain Music OMM0006
New York Counterpoint (2002, with Raschèr Saxophone Orchestra); BIS-NL-CD-5023
Amor (2002, with La Lupa, Voice, and Fabian Müller, Violoncello); Musikszene Schweiz MGB-CD-6188
Die Felshöhle des jungen Hermann Hesse (2002); Deutsche Grammophon CD-471-899-2
Goethe "Das Leben, es ist gut" (2003); Deutsche Grammophon CD-472-807-2
Edvard Grieg Summer Night (2010, with Edward Rushton, piano); Musicaphon M-56851
spectrum saxofonis vol. 2 (2011, with Jakoba Marten-Büsing, organ); Musicaphon M-56843
''Etudes-Vocalises" (2016, with Edward Rushton, piano); BIS-9056

External links
Harry White's web site
web site for Harry White's album "23 Etudes-Vocalises"
Biography (German)
Web site of the Swiss Saxophone Orchestra

References 

1967 births
American classical saxophonists
American male saxophonists
Living people
21st-century American saxophonists
21st-century American male musicians